Syncopacma coronillella is a moth of the family Gelechiidae. It is found in most of Europe, except Ireland, Great Britain, Fennoscandia, the Baltic region, the Benelux, Portugal and part of the Balkan Peninsula.

The wingspan is 10–12 mm.

The larvae feed on Securigera varia.

References

Moths described in 1833
Syncopacma
Moths of Europe